John Bahadur (17 June 1917 – 10 February 1981) was a Guyanese cricketer. He played in one first-class match for British Guiana in 1943/44.

See also
 List of Guyanese representative cricketers

References

External links
 

1917 births
1981 deaths
Guyanese cricketers
Guyana cricketers